AdventHealth Celebration (formerly Florida Hospital Celebration Health) is an acute care hospital in Celebration, Florida. The  220-bed acute-care facility  serves visitors to the Walt Disney World, and is the community hospital for Greater Orlando and a major tertiary referral hospital for Central Florida (including Osceola County, Orange County, Polk County and Lake County).

Services

In 2012, the hospital web site reported dealing annually with 10,219 admissions, 69,504 outpatient visits and 52,956 emergency cases; there were 1,615 deliveries. The hospital operated 112 licensed beds with 104 critical care beds (Includes ICU and PCU). 2,123 staff physicians and dentists, and 1,050 other employees worked there.

The hospital provides inpatient and outpatient services, 24-hour emergency care, maternity, cardiac, diagnostic and catheterization services, wellness programs, women's and men's health programs, as well as primary care and specialty physicians on-site. Beyond these usual services, the facility features a range of specific service lines, including bariatrics, women's services (OB/GYN), Head and Neck Surgery, sports medicine, joint and hip replacement and spine treatment.

Special facilities include:
 The Nicholson Center for Surgical Advancement
 The Cancer Institute
 The Lifestyle Enhancement Center
 The Pain Center
 The Global Robotics Institute
  Fitness Centre & Day Spa
 State-of-the-art Seaside Imaging Services unit

History 
The hospital opened in 1997, as part of The Walt Disney Company's planned community of Celebration, Florida. Its emergency rooms began service in 1998. It was envisioned as a patient-friendly physical environment, designed with a Mediterranean resort theme and incorporating architectural components that were considered at that time to be cutting-edge, including the extensive use of natural light and gardens; patient rooms and other spaces that were designed to encourage family involvement; artwork; and sound management.

In 2001 it was the first facility in Florida to offer Senographe 2000D digital mammography system. In 2006 it introduced 64-Slice Lightspeed CT Scanner Technology. The Bariatric program began in 2002, and in 2006 was recognized as a Bariatric Surgery Center of Excellence by the American Society for Bariatric Surgery. In 2004 its Imaging Center introduced Max & Buddy The Bear - the first animatronics in a hospital setting. In 2002 it conducted its first minimally invasive hip replacement surgery. A Joint Replacement Center opened in 2007.  
 
In early 2011, the hospital announced it would increase the number of beds available from 112 beds to 174 beds.

Recognition 
AdventHealth Celebration has been recognized by U.S. News & World Report as "One of America's Best Hospitals" for ten years.

In 2010, the hospital's s Metabolic Medicine and Surgery Institute and Joint Replacement Center earned the Gold Seal of Approval for health care quality.

References

External links 

  
 Global Robotics Institute

AdventHealth
Hospital buildings completed in 1997
Hospitals in Florida
Celebration, Florida
Buildings and structures in Osceola County, Florida
1997 establishments in Florida